Adventures of Sir Galahad is the 41st serial released in 1949 by Columbia Pictures. Directed by Spencer Gordon Bennet, it stars George Reeves, Nelson Leigh, William Fawcett, Hugh Prosser, and Lois Hall. It was based on Arthurian legend, one of the very few serials of the time with a period setting that was not a western.

Plot
The Arthurian film cycle started with the Adventures of Sir Galahad serial. In this version, the youth Galahad, trying to emulate his father Sir Lancelot, wants fervently to be admitted to the Knights of the Round Table order. When he defeats Sir Bors and Sir Mordred in tournament, King Arthur agrees to knighthood, but only if Galahad can guard Excalibur for one night.

Unfortunately, during that night the sword is stolen by a mysterious personage known only as the Black Knight. Possession of Excalibur makes the holder invincible and without it the sovereignty of Arthur is endangered. Galahad is refused knighthood until the sword is found. Galahad, aided by Sir Bors, is hindered in his quest by Ulric, the Saxon King, who invades England, and by Merlin the magician, who harasses our hero at every turn.

Galahad suspects that the Black Knight is a traitor within Camelot who seeks the throne in alliance with the Saxons, while Morgan le Fay, Arthur's half sister and also a magician, helps him fight both Merlin's magic and the Saxons.

Cast
George Reeves as Sir Galahad. In the opinion of Cline, Reeves makes this a superior serial to Son of the Guardsman, another period serial made by the same studio.
 Nelson Leigh as King Arthur
 William Fawcett as Merlin, the Magician
 Hugh Prosser as Sir Lancelot
 Lois Hall as Lady of the Lake
 Charles King as Sir Bors
 Pat Barton as Morgan le Fay
 Don Harvey as Bartog, Ulric's Aide
 Jim Diehl as Sir Kay
 Marjorie Stapp as Queen Guinevere
 John Merton as Ulric, the Saxon King
 Pierce Lyden as Cawker
 Paul Frees as The Black Knight (voice)

Chapter titles
 The Stolen Sword
 Galahad's Daring
 Prisoners of Ulric
 Attack on Camelot
 Galahad to the Rescue
 Passage of Peril
 Unknown Betrayer
 Perilous Adventure
 Treacherous Magic
 The Sorcerer's Spell
 Valley of No Return
 Castle Perilous
 The Wizard's Revenge
 Quest for the Queen
 Galahad's Triumph
Source:

Production
The Adventures of Sir Galahad was based on Arthurian myth and legend, a setting that gave it "unique" opportunities for a serial.

Sam Katzman said he was prompted to make it after reading a 1948 article which said J. Arthur Rank wanted to make a film about the Arthurian legend. "King Arthur and his knights are important to our kids," said Katzman. "I knew what would happen. If Rank made the picture there would be too much history and not enough action and that would spoil it all. So I decided to make The Adventures of Sir Galahad."

Katzman elected not to feature the Holy Grail because "we don't want religious complications" and said there was some romance but not too much as "the kids don't want too much romance. We just suggest that Galahad might work something out later on."

References

External links

Cinefania.com
eMoviePoster.com
Serial-Experience.com

1949 films
1940s fantasy adventure films
1940s English-language films
Arthurian films
American fantasy adventure films
Columbia Pictures film serials
American black-and-white films
Films directed by Spencer Gordon Bennet
Films with screenplays by George H. Plympton
1940s American films